Salak is a town and district in North Sumatra province of Indonesia, the capital of Pakpak Bharat Regency.

Climate
Salak has an elevation moderated tropical rainforest climate (Af) with heavy rainfall year-round.

References 

Populated places in North Sumatra
Regency seats of North Sumatra